Mohara (also Romanized as Moḩarā and Moḩarrā; also known as Mohreh) is a village in Tork-e Gharbi Rural District, Jowkar District, Malayer County, Hamadan Province, Iran. At the 2006 census, its population was 120, in 33 families.

References 

Populated places in Malayer County